Tonjaran (also Romanized as Ţonjarān; also known as Tongarān) is a village in Salehan Rural District, in the Central District of Khomeyn County, Markazi Province, Iran. At the 2006 census, its population was 414, in 108 families.

References 

Populated places in Khomeyn County